Dan Gibson (January 19, 1922 in Montreal – March 18, 2006) was a Canadian photographer, cinematographer and sound recordist.
During the late 1940s, Dan Gibson took photographs and made nature films, including Audubon Wildlife Theatre. Gibson produced many films and television series through which he learned how to record wildlife sound. He pioneered techniques of recording, and also helped design equipment to optimize results, including the "Dan Gibson Parabolic Microphone". Some of his early recordings of the 1950s and 1960s were released on LP records, and started his Solitudes series, which was introduced in 1981.

Gibson is well regarded for his contributions to the Friends of Algonquin Park, and his dedication to the Algonquin Park Residents Association. Having a lease of land in Algonquin Provincial Park gave Gibson and his family (wife: Helen, children: Mary-Jane or "Kirkie," Holly, Dan, and Gordon) a unique opportunity to connect with nature, and it certainly fueled his passion for the study, preservation and interaction with wildlife.

In 1994, Gibson was awarded The Order of Canada for his environmental works. In 1997, he was awarded the Walt Grealis Special Achievement Award at the Juno Awards ceremony in Hamilton, Ontario.

In 2004, he released his first DVD, Natural Beauty, which was originally shot in High Definition.

Major productions
 Wings in the Wilderness - Feature Film (Narrated by Lorne Greene) 
 Audubon Wildlife Theatre - 78 episode TV series 
 Wildlife Cinema - multiple episode TV series 
 To the Wild Country - 10 episode TV series (Narrated by Lorne Greene) 
 Wild Canada - multiple episode TV series

Film awards
 Whitethroat - Golden Gate Award - 1965 San Francisco Film Festival
 Land of the Loon - Best TV Film of the Year and Certificate of Honour for outstanding contribution to the art of cinematography from the CSC, 1967 Canadian Film Awards 
 Adventure Trent Severn - Award of Merit, 1967 Canadian Film Awards 
 Winter Potpourri - Michigan Outdoor Writers Award of Merit 1969 
 Sounds of Nature - Etrog for Best Sound in a Non-theatrical Film, 1971 Canadian Film Awards 
 Fly Geese F-L-Y - Blue Ribbon Award for Best Children’s Film, 1972 American Film Festival 
 Golden Autumn - Teddy Award, 1973 U.S. National Outdoor-Travel Film Festival 
 Dan Gibson’s Nature Family - Best Wildlife Film of the Year, 1972 Canadian Film Awards 
 Return of the Giants - Best Wildlife Film of the Year, 1973 Canadian Film Awards 
 Land of the Big Ice - Best Wildlife Film of the Year, 1974 Canadian Film Awards 
 Wings In The Wilderness - Etrog for Best Sound in a Non-theatrical Film and Certificate of Honour for outstanding contribution to the art of cinematography from the CSC, 1975 Canadian Film Awards 
 Return of the Winged Giants - John Muir Award for Best Ecological Film, 1977 National Educational Film Festival, USA and Best Wildlife Film, 1977 Saskatchewan International Film Festival

Album awards
 Solitudes albums have sold over 20,000,000 worldwide 
 15 Solitudes albums have been Certified Gold (50,000 units sold) in Canada 
 11 Solitudes albums have been Certified Platinum (100,000 units sold) or multi-Platinum status.

Discography

Until April 2012, about 234 albums (including 13 compilations) were released by Solitudes.

Some popular albums are:
 Solitudes 25: Silver Anniversary Collection 
 Best of Solitudes: 20th Anniversary 
 Listen to the Mockingbird 
 Loon Echo Lake 
 Natural Beauty DVD 
 Rolling Thunder 
 Wildlife Identification by Sound 
 Spring Romance, album by Dan Gibson 1998

References

1922 births
2006 deaths
Canadian naturalists
Upper Canada College alumni
20th-century naturalists